Neive is a comune (municipality) in the Province of Cuneo in the Italian region Piedmont, located about  southeast of Turin and about  northeast of Cuneo.

Neive borders the following municipalities: Barbaresco, Castagnito, Castagnole delle Lanze, Coazzolo, Magliano Alfieri, Mango, Neviglie, and Treiso.

References 

Cities and towns in Piedmont